Alton H. Blackington (1898–1963) was a photographer, writer, radio personality and television show host known for his features on life in New England. He was known as Blackie. Described as a "dyed-in-the-wool Yankee", he was a chronicler of New England lore and legend. His extensive photo collection included many shots from New England as well as others from his travels abroad and to the American Southwest as well as the ones he collected through his photo company.

Blackington was born in Rockland, Maine. He served in the Navy during World War I.

In 1919 be joined the Boston Herald where he wrote features about New England for 10 years. He eventually established a photo company and became a lecturer and radio show host. He wrote his two "Yankee Yarns" books, Yankee Yarns (1954) and More Yankee Yarns (1956), and took his Yankee Yarns storytelling to television at NBC. He was awarded a posthumous Yankee Quill Award in 1981.

References

1898 births
1963 deaths
People from Rockland, Maine
American writers
20th-century American photographers
American radio DJs